Fellatio (also known as fellation, and in slang as blowjob, BJ, giving head, or sucking off) is an oral sex act involving a person stimulating the penis of another person by using the mouth, throat, or both. Oral stimulation of the scrotum may also be termed fellatio, or colloquially as teabagging. If fellatio is performed on oneself, the act is called autofellatio.

Fellatio can be sexually arousing for both participants, and may lead to orgasm for the partner being fellated. It may be performed by a sexual partner as foreplay before other sexual activities, such as vaginal or anal intercourse, or as an erotic and physically intimate act of its own. Fellatio creates a risk of contracting sexually transmitted infections (STIs), but the risk is significantly lower than that of vaginal or anal sex, especially for HIV transmission.

Most countries do not have laws banning the practice of fellatio, though some cultures may consider it taboo. People may also refrain from engaging in fellatio due to personal preference, negative feelings, or sexual inhibitions. Commonly, people do not view oral sex as affecting the virginity of either partner, though opinions on the matter vary.

Etymology
The English noun fellatio comes from the Latin , the past participle of the verb , meaning to suck. In fellatio the -us is replaced by the -io while the declension stem ends in -ion-, which gives the suffix the form -ion (cf. French fellation). The -io(n) ending is used in English to create nouns from Latin adjectives and it can indicate a state or action wherein the Latin verb is being, or has been, performed.

Further English words have been created based on the same Latin root. A person who performs fellatio upon another (i.e. who fellates,) may be termed a fellator. Latin's gender based declension means this word may be restricted to describing a male. The equivalent term for a female is fellatrix.

Practice

General

Fellatio can be sexually arousing for both participants, and males who receive fellatio commonly experience orgasm and ejaculation of semen during the act. People may use fellatio as foreplay to sexually arouse their sex partner before vaginal or anal intercourse, or other sexual activity, or they may perform it as an erotic and physically intimate act in its own right. The sex partner may be of either sex. When the penis is thrust into someone's mouth, it may be called irrumatio, though the term is rarely used.

The essential aspect of fellatio is oral stimulation of the penis through some combination of sucking, use of the tongue and lips, and movement of the mouth. One method is the sex partner taking the penis into the mouth and moving smoothly up and down the penis to a rhythm while being careful to avoid contact with the teeth. Fellatio may also include the oral stimulation of the scrotum, whether licking, sucking or taking the entire scrotum into the mouth. During the act, semen may be ejaculated into the partner's mouth.

It is difficult for some people to perform fellatio due to their sensitivities to the natural gag reflex. Different people have different sensitivities to the reflex, but some people learn to suppress the reflex. How much of the penis a partner can take into their mouth also depends on the size and length of the penis, and they most commonly only take the end of the penis into their mouth.

It is physically possible for men with sufficient flexibility, penis size, or both, to perform fellatio on themselves as a form of masturbation, in an act called autofellatio. However, few men possess sufficient flexibility and penis length to safely perform the necessary frontbend.

Deposition of semen

During fellatio, a partner may ingest semen from the penis. Nancy Friday's book, Men in Love – Men's Sexual Fantasies: The Triumph of Love over Rage (1982), suggests that swallowing semen is high on a man's intimacy scale. As late as 1976, some doctors were advising women in the eighth and ninth months of pregnancy not to swallow semen lest it induce premature labor, but it was later determined to be safe.

The male whose penis is being stimulated during fellatio typically becomes sexually aroused. Once the prerequisite level of sexual stimulation has been achieved and ejaculation becomes imminent, the semen may be discharged onto his partner. The male may position his penis prior to ejaculation so that semen will be deposited onto his partner's face (known as a "facial"), or other body part such as their neck, chest or breast.

Deep-throating

Deep-throating is a sexual act in which a person takes a partner's entire erect penis into the mouth and throat. The technique and term became popularized by the 1972 pornographic film Deep Throat. Generally, the person receiving fellatio is in control. For deep-throating, the penis must be long enough so that it can reach the back of the giver's throat.

Deep-throating can be difficult, due to the natural gag reflex triggered when the soft palate is touched. People have different sensitivities to this reflex, and with practice, some learn to suppress it. Deep-throating leads to an entirely different kind of oral stimulation in comparison to regular fellatio: the tongue is immobilized during deep-throating and sucking becomes impossible; the glans penis can be intensely stimulated by the tightness of the pharynx.

Other aspects

The man receiving fellatio receives direct sexual stimulation, while his partner may derive satisfaction from giving him pleasure. Giving and receiving fellatio may happen simultaneously in sex positions like 69 and daisy chain.

Fellatio is sometimes practiced when vaginal or anal penetration would create a physical difficulty for a sex partner. For example, it may be practiced during pregnancy instead of vaginal intercourse by couples wishing to engage in intimate sexual activity while avoiding the difficulty of vaginal intercourse during later stages of pregnancy.

Other reasons why a woman may not wish to have vaginal intercourse include apprehension of losing her virginity or of becoming pregnant, or because she may be menstruating.

Health aspects

Sexually transmitted infections
Chlamydia, human papillomavirus (HPV), gonorrhea, herpes, hepatitis (multiple strains), and other sexually transmitted infections (STIs/STDs) can be transmitted through oral sex. Any sexual exchange of bodily fluids with a person infected with HIV, the virus that causes AIDS, poses a risk of infection. Risk of STI infection, however, is generally considered significantly lower for oral sex than for vaginal or anal sex, with HIV transmission considered the lowest risk with regard to oral sex.

There is an increased risk of STI transmission if the receiving partner has wounds on his genitals, or if the giving partner has wounds or open sores on or in his or her mouth, or bleeding gums. Brushing the teeth, flossing, or undergoing dental work soon before or after giving fellatio can also increase the risk of transmission, because all of these activities can cause small scratches in the lining of the mouth. These wounds, even when they are microscopic, increase the chances of contracting STIs that can be transmitted orally under these conditions. Such contact can also lead to more mundane infections from common bacteria and viruses found in, around and secreted from the genital regions. Because of the aforementioned factors, medical sources advise the use of condoms or other effective barrier methods when performing or receiving fellatio with a partner whose STI status is unknown.

HPV and oral cancer link
Links have been reported between oral sex and oral cancer with HPV-infected people. A 2005 research study suggested that performing unprotected oral sex on a person infected with HPV might increase the risk of oral cancer. The study found that 36 percent of the cancer patients had HPV compared to only 1 percent of the healthy control group.

A 2007 study suggested a correlation between oral sex and throat cancer. It is believed that this is due to the transmission of HPV, a virus that has been implicated in the majority of cervical cancers and which has been detected in throat cancer tissue in numerous studies. The study concludes that people who had one to five oral sex partners in their lifetime had approximately a doubled risk of throat cancer compared with those who never engaged in this activity and those with more than five oral sex partners had a 250 percent increased risk.

Pregnancy and semen exposure

Fellatio cannot result in pregnancy, as there is no way for ingested sperm to reach the uterus and fallopian tubes to fertilize an egg cell. At any rate, acids in the stomach and digestive enzymes in the gastrointestinal tract break down and kill spermatozoa.

Clinical research has tentatively linked fellatio with immune modulation, indicating it may reduce the chance of complications during pregnancy. The potentially fatal complication pre-eclampsia was observed to occur less in women who regularly engaged in fellatio, with those who also ingested their partner's semen being at the least risk. The results were consistent with the fact that semen contains TGF-β1, the exchange of which between partners having a causal reduction in risk of pre-eclampsia caused by an immunological reaction. It is worth noting that fellatio is not the only viable mechanism for the transmission of TGF-β1.

Cultural views

Virginity

Oral sex is commonly used as a means of preserving virginity, especially among heterosexual pairings; this is sometimes termed technical virginity (which additionally includes anal sex, mutual masturbation and other non-penetrative sex acts, but excludes penile-vaginal sex). The concept of "technical virginity" or sexual abstinence through oral sex is particularly popular among teenagers in the United States, including with regard to teenage girls who not only fellate their boyfriends to preserve their virginities, but also to create and maintain intimacy or to avoid pregnancy. Other reasons given for the practice among teenage girls are peer-group pressure and as their introduction to sexual activity. Additionally, gay males may regard fellatio as a way of maintaining their virginities, with penile-anal penetration defined as resulting in virginity loss, while other gay males may define fellatio as their main form of sexual activity.

Legality

Fellatio is legal in most countries. Laws of some jurisdictions regard fellatio as penetrative sex for the purposes of sexual offenses with regard to the act, but most countries do not have laws which ban the practice, in contrast to anal sex or extramarital sex. In Islamic literature, the only forms of sexual activity that are consistently explicitly prohibited within marriage are anal sex and sexual activity during menstruation. However, the exact attitude towards oral sex is a subject of disagreements between modern scholars of Islam. Authorities considering it "objectionable" do so because of the penis's supposedly impure fluids coming in contact with the mouth. Others emphasize that there is no decisive evidence to forbid oral sex.

In Malaysia, fellatio is illegal, but the law is seldom enforced. Under Malaysia's Section 377A of the Penal Code, the introduction of the penis into the anus or mouth of another person is considered a "carnal intercourse against the order of nature" and is punishable with imprisonment of 20 years maximum and whipping.

Tradition

Galienus called fellatio lesbiari since women of the island of Lesbos were supposed to have introduced the practice of using one's lips to give sexual pleasure.

However, according to the Kama Sutra, fellatio is above all a characteristic of eunuchs (or, according to other translations, of effeminate homosexuals or trans women similar to the modern Hijra of India), who use their mouths as a substitute for female genitalia.

Vātsyāyana, the author of the Kama Sutra, states that it is also practiced by "unchaste women", but mentions that there are widespread traditional concerns about this being a degrading or unclean practice, with known practitioners being evaded as love partners in large parts of the country. The author appears to somewhat agree with these attitudes, claiming that "a wise man" should not engage in that form of intercourse while acknowledging that it can be appropriate in some unspecified cases.

The Moche culture of ancient Peru worshipped daily life including sexual acts. They depicted fellatio in their ceramics.

In some cultures, such as Cambodia, Chinese in Southeast Asia, northern Manchu tribes along Amur River, Sambians in Papua New Guinea, Thailand, Telugus of India, Hawaii and other Pacific Islanders, briefly taking the penis of a male infant or toddler into one's mouth was considered a nonsexual form of affection or even a form of ritual, greeting, respect, parenting love, or lifesaving. According to some sources, it was an ancient Chinese custom for grandmothers, mothers, and elder sisters to calm their baby boys with fellatio. It has also been reported that some modern Chinese mothers have performed fellatio to their moribund sons as affection and means for lifesaving, because they culturally believe that when the penis is completely retracted into the abdomen, the boy or man will die.

Other animals

Flying foxes (a type of bat) have been observed engaging in oral sex. Indian flying fox males will lick a female's vulva both before and after copulation, with the length of pre-copulation cunnilingus positively correlated with length of copulation. The fruit bat Cynopterus sphinx, has been observed to engage in fellatio during mating. Pairs spend more time copulating if the female licks the male than if she does not. Male Livingstone's fruit bats have been observed engaging in homosexual fellatio, although it is unknown if this is an example of sexual behavior or social grooming. Bonin flying foxes also engage in homosexual fellatio, but the behavior has been observed independently of social grooming.

See also

 Bukkake
 Cum shot
 Cunnilingus
 Facial (sexual act)
 Fellatio in Halacha
 Gokkun
 Irrumatio
 Pearl necklace (sexuality)
 Steak and Blowjob Day
 Teabagging

References

 
Sexual acts
Penis
Articles containing video clips
Oral eroticism